Suresh Kumar Rai is a Nepalese politician, belonging to the Nepal Communist Party currently serving as the member of the Constituent Assembly of Nepal. In the 2017 Nepalese general election he was elected from the Udayapur 2 constituency, securing 22551 (56.07%)  votes.

References

Nepal MPs 2017–2022
Living people
Communist Party of Nepal (Maoist Centre) politicians
1976 births
Nepal MPs 1999–2002